Colla is a town and commune in Bordj Bou Arréridj Province, Algeria. According to the 1998 census it has a population of 7,963. In 2008, the population was about 6,123. In the commune, as of 2008, there are about 3,250 males, and 2,783 females.

References

Communes of Bordj Bou Arréridj Province